Latvijas Avīze (Latvian Newspaper) is a national conservative Latvian language national daily newspaper in Latvia, published in Riga.

The Latvian word avīze ('newspaper' or 'journal') is a loanword and cognate with the French word avis, meaning opinion, notice and advice.

History 
In January 1988, the newspaper Lauku Avīze ('Rural Newspaper') was first published in Soviet-occupied Latvia. After the restoration of Latvian independence in 1991 the AS Lauku Avīze (since 2017 - AS Latvijas Mediji) publishing house was established. In 2003, "Lauku Avīze" was renamed "Latvijas Avīze". In 2013, the publishing house worked with a profit of 23,140 euros and a turnover of 4,855,528 euros. In 2013, compared to 2012, the paper earned three times more, but the turnover decreased by 2%.

About the newspaper 
Latvijas Avīze reflects and analyzes social and political events and other developments in Latvia and the world every day. The newspaper won the Latvijas Pasts annual Press Subscription Award in the nomination "Most Delivered Publication in 2018".

Online edition 
Latvijas Avīze is the founder of LA.LV, a Latvian news portal. Initially in line with the content of the newspaper, in October 2020 the chief editor of the site, Atis Sauka, announced that the portal will change its identity and switch to content different from the print edition. The site also hosts video content from the Rīga TV24 TV channel under a cooperation agreement.

References

External links
 

Newspapers published in Latvia
Companies based in Riga
Mass media in Riga